Hasht Bandi-ye Do (also Romanized as Hasht Bandī-ye Do) is a village in Cheraghabad Rural District, Tukahur District, Minab County, Hormozgan Province, Iran. At the 2006 census, its population was 1,876, in 396 families.

References 

Populated places in Minab County